Morehead-Rowan County Clyde A. Thomas Regional Airport , is a public airport located seven nautical miles (13 km) northwest of the central business district of Morehead, a city in Rowan County, Kentucky, United States. It is owned by the Morehead-Rowan County Airport Board.

The new airport opened in 2007, which resulted in the closure of the old airport.

Facilities and aircraft 

References 

<http://www.gcr1.com/5010web/airport.cfm?Site=SYM&CFID=12642447&CFTOKEN=65150842>

External links 
 
 

Airports in Kentucky
Buildings and structures in Rowan County, Kentucky